Woman at Work is the debut album from a Scots-based  American musician and songwriter, Indiana Gregg. Released in 2007, the album was promoted through a national tour with Lemar and with the single, "Sweet Things", released June of the same year.  The album was produced by Ian Morrow (Seal, Lisa Stansfield, Wet Wet Wet).

Track listing 

All songs by Indiana Gregg, except where noted.(+)

 "Prelude"
 "Sweet Things" 
 "Something Like Me"
 "Love Is Blind"
 "Oh Me Oh My"
 "How Many Tears"
 "Crazy Crazy Crazy"
 "Groovy Kinda Wonderful"
 "Coming Around Again"
 "For Life"
 "Kiss Me All Night"
 "Kid Soldier"
 "Heaven Too Long"
 "One of Us" (+)

2007 debut albums